St. John's Episcopal Church is a historic Episcopal church located at Phoenix in Oswego County, New York.  It is a small frame Gothic Revival style structure built in 1911.

It was listed on the National Register of Historic Places in 1993.

It has been the home of the Schroeppel Historical Society since the 1980s.

References

Churches completed in 1911
20th-century Episcopal church buildings
Churches on the National Register of Historic Places in New York (state)
Episcopal church buildings in New York (state)
Carpenter Gothic church buildings in New York (state)
Churches in Oswego County, New York
National Register of Historic Places in Oswego County, New York
1911 establishments in New York (state)